The Ambassador of Malaysia to the Republic of Indonesia is the head of Malaysia's diplomatic mission to Indonesia. The position has the rank and status of an Ambassador Extraordinary and Plenipotentiary and is based in the Embassy of Malaysia, Jakarta.

List of heads of mission

Ambassadors to Indonesia

See also
 Indonesia–Malaysia relations

References 

 
Indonesia
Malaysia